Alec Musser (born April 11, 1973) is an American fitness model and actor.

Early life and education
Musser was raised on the East Coast in New Jersey and Connecticut, and attended the Westminster School before moving to San Diego where he eventually attended the University of San Diego. As a kid growing up, Alec credits his parents with instilling good morals, a strong work ethic, a respect for education and a love for sports and travel from an early age. His competitive nature was probably fostered from being the younger brother of John, with whom he competed for everything from grades to sports to girls. This sense of competition served Alec well growing up as a star athlete competing in football, ice hockey and lacrosse and as a star pupil graduating with high honors from both high school and college.

Career
After college, Alec moved to Mammoth Lakes, Ca. to work on the professional ski patrol at Mammoth Mountain, one of the largest ski resorts in America. Patrolling for three seasons, Alec quickly proved himself as a strong addition to the squad. At Mammoth he worked to maintain a safe ski area, provided first aid and transport to injured skiers and performed avalanche control on one of the best and most challenging mountains in the U.S., both as a skier and patroller. "It was the most fun and rewarding job I have ever had."

During the off season, Alec worked as a lifeguard and traveled to surf in exotic locales. It was during the summer after his third season that Alec was approached by a modeling agent. The agent quickly sent photos to Bruce Webber who was casting the new Abercrombie and Fitch campaign. Alec soon found himself in Miami then shortly after on the shopping bags and billboards for A and F. Since then Alec has traveled to places as far off as Paris, Greece, South Africa, Australia and Hawaii modeling for clients such as Gianfranco Ferré, GQ, Cosmopolitan, Men's Health, Speedo and Target.

In August 2005, Musser won the reality TV contest I Wanna Be a Soap Star to get the part on the popular soap All My Children. He took over the role of Del Henry for Winsor Harmon after a long absence since 1995. Although the show stated the role was a thirteen-week contract, head writer Megan McTavish extended his contract.

Musser is signed to Silver Model Management in New York City. He was with Nous Model Management in Los Angeles until 2008.
In 2012 he appeared in the television series Desperate Housewives as a masseur.

Filmography

Television
I Wanna Be a Soap Star as himself (2005 winner)
All My Children as Del Henry #2 (2005–07)
Rita Rocks as Plumber (2009)
Desperate Housewives as Friedrich (2012, episode "Watch While I Revise the World")

Films
Road to the Altar as Camera Guy
Grown Ups as Guy in the Waterpark

External links
Alec Musser's Official Website

Musser's stay in Pine Valley extended

1973 births
American male soap opera actors
Living people
Male actors from San Diego
American exercise instructors
Male models from New York (state)
Male actors from New York City
University of San Diego alumni
American male alpine skiers
Male actors from New Jersey
American male triathletes
Reality casting show winners